EP1 or EP 1 may refer to:

Music
 EP 1 (Crosses EP), 2011
 EP1 (dollys EP), 2013
 EP1 (Duke Dumont EP), 2014
 EP1 (FKA Twigs EP), 2012
 EP1 (Kleptones EP), 2006
 EP 1 (Odd Year and the Reverb Junkie EP), 2012
 EP1 (Pixies EP), 2013
 EP 1 (Qveen Herby EP), 2017
 EP1 (Smoke & Jackal EP), 2012
 EP 1 (Zero 7 EP), 2000
 EP001, an EP by Thenewno2, 2006
 EP 1, an EP by Basement Jaxx, 1994
 EP1, an EP by Viktoria Modesta, 2010

Science
 Prostaglandin EP1 receptor, a human gene
 EP1 procyclin, a trypanosome procyclin protein

Transport
 EP1 (electric locomotive), a Russian locomotive
 New Haven EP-1, an electric locomotive built for the New York, New Haven and Hartford Railroad, 1905–1908

See also
 Episode I (disambiguation), the first release of any series
 EpOne, a 2000 EP by Hundred Reasons